Yedakumari is the place in Sakleshpur taluk in the midst of western ghats in the state of Karnataka, India. There is a railway station here. The place lies en route Mangalore to Bangalore railway line and is the most fascinating stretch of the green route. The train running in between these two cities generally halt at Yedakumari for technical reasons. Yedakumari railway station has s become resting place for trekkers who are trekking the western ghats following the railway tracks.

References

Villages in Dakshina Kannada district